Saint John, the Beheaded (Italian: San Giovanni decollato) is a 1940 Italian comedy film directed by Amleto Palermi and Giorgio Bianchi and starring Totò, Titina De Filippo and Silvana Jachino. It was based on a play by Nino Martoglio. The film was made at the Cinecittà Studios in Rome.

San Giovanni decollato or Saint John the Baptist's head on a platter, was a common religious motif from the Middle Ages on, parodied in the film's poster.

Plot
In a town, near Naples, in 1900, the cobbler Agostino Miciacio is accused by tenants of his apartment building to be crazy. In fact Agostino is a lively man, mocked by everyone because he is messy. He is very devoted to John the Baptist, so Agostino lights a candle every night in a small chapel in the courtyard. But some of the oil in the wax necessary for the luminary, disappears every night. It is a fact that Agostino does not tolerate theft, but he does not know that behind these thefts continue, there is a gang of thugs. Meanwhile, Agostino, in addition to following the case of oil stolen, must fight against the daughter Serafina who has fallen in love with a poor young lamplighter. But he also has to fight against his wife Concetta, authoritative and cruel woman, so he hopes that St. John makes a grace for him, taking away her voice.

Cast

References

Bibliography
 Moliterno, Gino. Historical Dictionary of Italian Cinema. Scarecrow Press, 2008.

External links

1940 films
1940s historical comedy films
1940s Italian-language films
Films directed by Amleto Palermi
Films directed by Giorgio Bianchi
Films with screenplays by Cesare Zavattini
Italian black-and-white films
Italian films based on plays
Italian historical comedy films
1940s Italian films